The Presbyterian Church in Korea (HapDongChongShin I.) is a Reformed Presbyterian denomination in South Korea. The church was constituted in 1985, when it split off the Presbyterian Church in Korea (HapDongJinRi). The first moderator was Pastor Lee Geun-Su. The Apostles Creed and the Westminster Confession are the official standards.
In 2004 there was 11,765 members in 100 congregations.

References 

Presbyterian denominations in South Korea
Presbyterian denominations in Asia